Dead Man's Seat is a 1984 Portuguese drama film directed by António-Pedro Vasconcelos. The film was selected as the Portuguese entry for the Best Foreign Language Film at the 57th Academy Awards, but was not accepted as a nominee.

Cast
 Ana Zanatti as Ana Mónica
 Pedro Oliveira
 Teresa Madruga as Marta
 Luís Lima Barreto as Alvaro Allen
 Carlos Coelho as Inspector Moreira
 Isabel Mota as Dulce
 Ruy Furtado as Neves
 Diogo Vasconcelos as João
 Natalina José as Janitor

See also
 List of submissions to the 57th Academy Awards for Best Foreign Language Film
 List of Portuguese submissions for the Academy Award for Best Foreign Language Film

References

External links
 

1984 films
1984 drama films
Portuguese drama films
1980s Portuguese-language films
Films directed by António-Pedro Vasconcelos